Try Anything Once is the first solo album by Alan Parsons, released in 1993. It was his first album following the split of The Alan Parsons Project.

This album features vocals by Ambrosia's David Pack, Jacqui Copland, former Mindbender and 10cc guitarist Eric Stewart, and Manfred Mann's Earth Band frontman Chris Thompson. The album features completely digital recording and mixing. It was recorded at Parson's first "Parsonics" studio in Sussex England with the orchestra recorded at Air Studios in London.

There is an Easter egg inside the inlay. One of the pictures is a stereogram; when the viewer looks at it correctly, an image of a man and woman upside down will appear, similar to the other pictures in the album's artwork. This image is also on the CD itself.

Track listing

Personnel
 Alan Parsons – synthesizer, acoustic guitar, bass, flute, background vocals, producer
 Ian Bairnson – synthesizer, bass, guitar, pedal steel guitar, background vocals
 Richard Cottle – synthesizer, saxophone
 Andrew Powell – bass, synthesizer, electric piano, autoharp, orchestra director
 Stuart Elliott – drums, synthesizer
 David Pack – synthesizer, guitar, vocals
 Jeremy Parsons – guitar
 Philharmonia Orchestra – strings
  – fiddle, violin, mandolin
 Eric Stewart – vocals
 Chris Thompson – vocals
 Jacqui Copland – vocals, background vocals

Charts

References

Alan Parsons albums
1993 debut albums
Albums with cover art by Storm Thorgerson
Albums produced by Alan Parsons
Arista Records albums